Cleistothelebolus is a genus of fungi in the family Pyronemataceae. It is monotypic, containing the single species Cleistothelebolus nipigonensis.

External links
Index Fungorum

Pyronemataceae
Monotypic Ascomycota genera